The Fiat B.R. 1/4 was a light bomber series, developed in Italy shortly after World War I.

Design and development
The B.R was a development of the SIA 9 reconnaissance aircraft, incorporating major strengthening of that design. Its general layout was identical to its predecessor: a two-bay biplane with tandem, open cockpits for pilot and observer, and tailskid undercarriage. Shortly after entering service with the Regia Aeronautica, however, Rosatelli developed an improved version using the Warren truss-style bracing that would become a hallmark of his designs over the next decade.

The B.R. was evolved into a number of increasingly capable variants; however, by the time the later members of the family were produced, 15 years had passed since the initial design, and the type was already obsolete. At its peak, the BR equipped 15 light bomber squadrons of the Regia Aeronautica. Two examples were also exported to Sweden, and one to Hungary.

In 1922, a specially modified BR designated the R.700 was used to set the absolute world airspeed record at 336 km/h (210 mph). The same aircraft was used to contest the Coupe Deutsch de la Meurthe in September that year.

Variants
 B.R. - initial production version with Fiat A.14 engine and conventional struts
 B.R.1 - improved version with new radiator and landing gear, and Warren truss struts (150 built)
 B.R.2 - strengthened structure, new landing gear, and Fiat A.25 engine
R.22 - reconnaissance aircraft of which two prototypes and 23 production versions were built. Although resembling the BR.2 it was of smaller dimensions and the wing and fuselage structures were all-metal. All examples flown by Regia Aeronautica with Fiat A.22 engine
 B.R.3 - new landing gear, fitted with radio and panoramic camera and (in later versions) Handley Page-type slats (100 built)
 B.R.4 - substantial redesign with revised aerodynamics, new landing gear, and new radiator arrangement (one built)
 R.700 - racer for world airspeed record attempt

Operators

Royal Hungarian Air Force

Corpo Aeronautico Militare

Swedish Air Force As the B 1 and B 2.

Chinese Nationalist Air Force Operated the BR.3

Specifications (B.R.2)

See also

References

 
 
 
 

BR
Single-engined tractor aircraft
Biplanes
1910s Italian bomber aircraft
Military aircraft of World War I
Aircraft first flown in 1919